Euphorbia terracina, the Geraldton carnation weed, is a species of perennial herb in the family Euphorbiaceae. It has a self-supporting growth form and simple, broad leaves. Flowers are visited by Lipotriches brachysoma, Lipotriches natalensis, Lipotriches crassula, and Nomia bouyssoui.

Sources

References 

terracina
Flora of Malta